Amberstar is the first installment in Thalion Software's never-finished role-playing video game trilogy. Although considerably more advanced, the game has many similarities to Thalion's earlier game Dragonflight, and was by many fans thought to be a sequel. As with most of Thalion's other releases, the public interest was somewhat limited. A sequel, Ambermoon, was released in 1993.

Plot 
The game is set in the fictional world of Lyramion and begins with the player situated at the graves of his parents. As the player sets out for adventure, it becomes apparent that an evil entity named Lord Tarbos, who was imprisoned a thousand years earlier, is about to be released again to wreak havoc upon Lyramion. The player - helped by the various adventurers who join the party along the way - must recover the thirteen missing pieces of the Amberstar, the talisman that banished Lord Tarbos initially, to defeat the demon once again.

Development 
The musical score is by Thalion's Jochen Hippel.

Reception 
Amberstar received mixed to positive reviews in Germany and the UK. Many critics praised the deep storyline while feeling that the graphics were a bit outdated in comparison to other current RPGs such as Ultima Underworld or Might and Magic: Clouds of Xeen.

The One gave the Amiga version of Amberstar an overall score of 78%, comparing its gameplay to Ultima VI and Eye of the Beholder, stating that it "[mixes] the depth, character interaction and size of [Ultima VI] with the first-person 3D immediacy of [Eye of the Beholder]". The One praises the amount of content in Amberstar, punctuating this by saying "No matter what your predicament, there's always something new to see or do."  The One criticizes Amberstar's graphics, stating that "the 3D bits are by-and-large redundant - the graphics are unattractive, direct action with the 3D environment is minimal", as well as the UI, calling it "over-complicated and not particularly elegant", furthermore stating that "a little more design forethought" would improve Amberstar's overall appeal. The One also criticises Amberstar's switching back and forth between a first-person perspective and a third-person top-down perspective, and questions the purpose of this design decision.

Legacy 
While planned as first part in a trilogy, Amberstar was succeeded by only one sequel called Ambermoon. Unlike Amberstar, Ambermoon was released only on Amiga. Disappointing sales of both Amberstar and Ambermoon led Thalion Software to close after the sequel's German release. The title of what was supposed to be the third and final game was disclosed by game creator Karsten Köper as being AmberWorlds.

References

External links
Amberstar at MobyGames
Amberstar at Hall of Light
Amberstar at Atari Mania

1992 video games
Amiga games
Atari ST games
DOS games
Fantasy video games
Role-playing video games
Video games developed in Germany
Video games scored by Jochen Hippel
Single-player video games
Thalion Software games